The 2007 Vuelta a Castilla y León was the 22nd edition of the Vuelta a Castilla y León cycle race and was held on 26 March to 30 March 2007. The race started in Zamora and finished in Soria. The race was won by Alberto Contador.

Teams
Sixteen teams of up to eight riders started the race:

General classification

References

Vuelta a Castilla y León
Vuelta a Castilla y León by year
2007 in Spanish sport